Kəhrizli or Kyagrizli or Khagrizli may refer to:
Bala Kəhrizli, Azerbaijan
Böyük Kəhrizli, Azerbaijan
Kəhrizli, Goranboy, Azerbaijan